7742 Altamira, provisional designation , is a Henan asteroid from the central region of the asteroid belt, approximately 7 kilometers in diameter. It was discovered by Czech astronomer Antonín Mrkos at the South Bohemian Kleť Observatory in the Czech Republic, on 20 October 1985. It was named for the Cave of Altamira in Spain.

Orbit and classification 

Altamira is a member of the Henan family, a large asteroid family in the intermediate main-belt, named after 2085 Henan. It orbits the Sun in the central asteroid belt at a distance of 2.5–2.9 AU once every 4 years and 6 months (1,639 days; semi-major axis of 2.72 AU). Its orbit has an eccentricity of 0.08 and an inclination of 4° with respect to the ecliptic. The body's observation arc begins at Palomar Observatory in May 1988, two and a half years after its official discovery observation at Klet.

Physical characteristics

Spectral type 

Altamira has been characterized as an L-type asteroid by Pan-STARRS photometric survey, which agrees with the overall spectral type for members of the Henan family.

Rotation period 

In January 2014, a rotational lightcurve of Altamira was obtained from photometric observation by astronomers at the Palomar Transient Factory in California. Lightcurve analysis gave a short rotation period of  hours with a brightness amplitude of 0.11 magnitude.

Diameter and albedo 

According to the survey carried out by the NEOWISE mission of NASA's Wide-field Infrared Survey Explorer, Altamira measures 6.5 kilometers in diameter, and its surface has an albedo of 0.184. The Collaborative Asteroid Lightcurve Link assumes a standard albedo for carbonaceous asteroids of 0.057 and consequently calculates a larger diameter of 8.7 kilometers.

Naming 

This minor planet was named after the famous Cave of Altamira, located in northern Spain. Discovered in 1879, its prehistoric cave paintings feature drawings of wild bison, deer, horses and boar, as well as handprints of the artists who created them. The cave with its paintings has been declared a UNESCO World Heritage Site. The asteroid's name was proposed by Czech astronomer Miloš Tichý. The official naming citation was published by the Minor Planet Center on 24 June 2002.

References

External links 
 Asteroid Lightcurve Database (LCDB), query form (info )
 Dictionary of Minor Planet Names, Google books
 Asteroids and comets rotation curves, CdR – Observatoire de Genève, Raoul Behrend
 Discovery Circumstances: Numbered Minor Planets (5001)-(10000) – Minor Planet Center
 
 

007742
Discoveries by Antonín Mrkos
Named minor planets
19851020